Gosford Park is a 2001 mystery comedy-drama film directed by Robert Altman and written by Julian Fellowes. It premiered on November 7, 2001 at the London Film Festival. The film then received a limited release across theaters in the United States on December 26, 2001, before being widely released in January 2002 by USA Films. It was released on February 1, 2002 in the United Kingdom. Gosford Park has earned over $87 million in its combined total gross at the box office.

Gosford Park garnered various awards and nominations following its release, with nominations ranging from recognition of the screenplay and its direction to the cast's acting performance, particularly Helen Mirren and Maggie Smith. The film received seven Academy Awards nominations; the ceremony saw Fellowes win for Best Original Screenplay. At the 55th British Academy Film Awards, Gosford Park came away with two awards from nine nominations. Three of the film's actresses earned nominations for Best European Actress at the European Film Awards. The film received five nominations at the 59th Golden Globe Awards and Altman won the award for Best Director. Gosford Park won all six of the awards that it was nominated for at the National Society of Film Critics and the New York Film Critics Circle.

The film won two awards at the 8th Screen Actors Guild Awards for Outstanding Performance by a Female Actor in a Supporting Role and Outstanding Performance by a Cast in a Motion Picture. The film went on to win four more Best Cast awards from the Broadcast Film Critics Association, Florida Film Critics Circle, and Online Film Critics Society. Fellowes received recognition for the film's screenplay from the Writers Guild of America, where he won the Best Original Screenplay award. He subsequently received three more awards and three nominations. Fellowes was also nominated for Best Newcomer at the British Academy Film Awards. The film's score composer, Patrick Doyle received two nominations for his work. Doyle was nominated for Composer of the Year from the American Film Institute and he won the award for Soundtrack Composer of the Year from the World Soundtrack Awards. The film's costume, hair and make-up also earned three nominations between them. In 2008 the American Film Institute nominated the film for the Top 10 Mystery Films list.

Awards and nominations

References
General

Specific

External links
 

Lists of accolades by film